Sisig is a Filipino dish made from pork jowl and ears (maskara), pork belly, and chicken liver which is usually seasoned with calamansi, onions, and chili peppers. It originates from the Pampanga region in Luzon.

Sisig is a staple of Kapampangan cuisine. The city government of Angeles, Pampanga, through City Ordinance No. 405, series of 2017, declared sizzling sisig babi ("pork sisig") as a tangible heritage of Angeles City.

Origin 
The earliest known record of the word sisig can be traced back to 1732, and was recorded by Augustinian friar Diego Bergaño in his Vocabulary of the Kapampangan Language in Spanish and Dictionary of the Spanish Language in Kapampangan. Bergaño defines sisig as a "salad, including green papaya, or green guava eaten with a dressing of salt, pepper, garlic and vinegar." The term mannisig as in mannisig manga, a phrase still used today refers to eating green mangoes dipped in vinegar.

The term also came to be used to a method of preparing fish and meat, especially pork, which is marinated in a sour liquid such as lemon juice or vinegar, then seasoned with salt, pepper and other spices.

It is commonly accepted that the use of the pig's head in the dish came from the excess meat from the commissaries of Clark Air Base in Angeles City. Pig heads were purchased cheap (or free) since they were not used in preparing meals for the U.S. Air Force personnel stationed there during the American Occupation of Luzon and Visayas. Aling Lucing became popular when she grilled the pig's ears and added the cheeks to accommodate the bigger demand, a recipe she learned from the nextdoor stall owner in Crossing, Ricardo "Bapang Kadok" Dinio. The evolution of sisig moved forward when Benedict Pamintuan of Sugay's, a restaurant also in Angeles, thought of using a sizzling plate as a serving vessel so that the pork fat would not go cold and turn into lard when it was served. Sisig still has many variations with recipes varying from city to city, and sometimes family to family, in the Kapampangan province.

Sisig queen 

Lucia Cunanan of Angeles, also known as "Aling Lucing", has been credited with reinventing sisig by grilling the pig's ears, and using the cheeks as well. The Philippine Department of Tourism has acknowledged that her "Aling Lucing's" restaurant had established Angeles as the "Sisig Capital of the Philippines" in 1974. Cunanan's trademark sisig was developed in mid-1974 when she served a concoction of grilled and chopped pig ears and cheeks seasoned with vinegar, calamansi juice, chopped onions and chicken liver and served in hot plates. Today, varieties include sisig ala pizzailo, pork combination, green mussels or tahong, mixed seafood, ostrich sisig, crocodile sisig, spicy python, frog sisig and tokwa't baboy, among others.

Preparation 
According to Cunanan's recipe, preparing sisig comes in three phases: boiling, broiling and finally grilling. A pig's head is first boiled to remove hairs and to tenderize it. Portions of it are then chopped and grilled or broiled. Finally, coarsely chopped onions are added and served on a sizzling plate.

Variations of sisig may include pork or chicken liver and/or any of the following: eggs, ox brains, chicharon (pork cracklings), and mayonnaise; although these additions are common nowadays, they are frowned upon by the traditionalist chefs of Pampanga as it deviates far from the identity of the original sisig. Recently, local chefs have experimented with ingredients other than pork such as chicken, squid, tuna, and tofu.

Festival 
The annual "Sisig Festival" (Sadsaran Qng Angeles) is held every year during December in Angeles, Pampanga, celebrating the Kapampangan dish. It started in 2003 and was made an annual festival by Mayor Carmelo Lazatin in December 2004 to promote the city's culinary prowess. The festival also features a contest where chefs compete in making dishes, primarily sisig. Congo Grille, a restaurant chain in the country, was the winner in 2006.

In 2008, the festival was put on hiatus following Aling Lucing's death. In 2014, Ayala Malls's Marquee Mall incorporated the festival by including it within their annual Big Bite! Northern Food Festival, held every October or November.

The Angeles City Tourism Office organized a festival on April 29, 2017. The revival of the festival was in line with the Philippine Department of Tourism's Flavors of the Philippines campaign. Now called "Sisig Fiesta", the festivities were held at Valdes Street, Angeles (also known as "Crossing" since it was a former railroad track), where Aling Lucing reinvented the dish. The newly revived Sisig Fiesta was a one-day event that featured a line up of sisig sampler banquet, sisig and BBQ stalls, cooking demonstrations with celebrity chefs, and a showcase of Angeleño culinary talent through competitions.

See also
 Dinakdakan - a similar dish from the Ilocos Region of the Philippines
 Livermush – a Southern United States pork food product prepared using pig liver, parts of pig heads, cornmeal and spices

References 

Philippine pork dishes
Offal
Culture of Pampanga